Ermine may refer to three species of mustelid in the genus Mustela:

 Stoat or Eurasian ermine, Mustela erminea, found throughout Eurasia and northern North America
 American ermine, Mustela richardsonii, found throughout North America aside from most of Alaska and the Arctic
 Haida ermine, Mustela haidarum, endemic to Haida Gwaii and the Alexander Archipelago on the Pacific Northwest coast of North America

Ermine may also refer to: 
 Ermine (heraldry), the white winter fur and black tail end of the stoat, which is historically worn by and associated with royalty and high officials
 "Ermine marks" are dark patches of color on the white limb of a horse, just above the level of the hoof
 Ermine moth, a family of moths
 Ermine, a northern suburb of Lincoln, England
 Ermine Street, a Roman Road running from London to Lincoln and York
 Ermine, Kentucky, a town in the U.S. state of Kentucky
 Ermine (band), a Canadian progressive rock band

See also
 Erminie, a 19th-century comic opera